The 1899–1900 Michigan State Spartans men's basketball team represented Michigan State University for the 1899–1900 college men's basketball season. The head coach was Charles Bemies coaching the team is first season.

Schedule

|-

References

Michigan State Spartans men's basketball seasons
Michigan State
Michigan State|Michigan
Michigan State|Michigan